The Embassy of the Philippines in Santiago is the diplomatic mission of the Republic of the Philippines to the Republic of Chile. Opened in 1981, it is currently located at Calle Félix de Amesti 367, northeast of Santiago proper in the city of Las Condes, Santiago Province.

History
The Philippines did not initially open a resident mission in Chile when diplomatic relations between the two countries were established in 1947 — the first Southeast Asian country to do so. While Chile opened its embassy in Manila in December 1967, the Philippine Embassy in Buenos Aires initially represented the Philippines in Chile, with Ambassador Luis Moreno Salcedo being accredited to Chile on March 23, 1963.

A resident Philippine embassy in Santiago would not be opened until 1981, during the presidency of Ferdinand Marcos, when Rodolfo A. Arizala was appointed the Philippines' first resident ambassador to Chile. Notably, when Arizala arrived in Santiago on August 21, 1981 to assume his post, he was initially billeted at the Hotel Carrera by the central Plaza de la Constitución, which today houses the offices of Chile's Ministry of Foreign Affairs, while scouting locations for the chancery and ambassadorial residence. The hotel manager, a retired general who in his youth had played basketball against Ambrosio Padilla during the 1936 Summer Olympics as part of its men's basketball team and who had since befriended him, offered the hotel as his residence for the duration of his tenure at a significant discount.

In 2016, a number of groups led by the Fundación Daya organized a protest outside the Embassy against the policies of President Rodrigo Duterte and the Philippine Drug War, which they also organized again the following year as part of a worldwide campaign to reform global drug policy.

Staff and activities

The Philippine Embassy in Santiago is provisionally headed by a chargé d'affaires, pending the appointment of a new ambassador by the Philippine government. The current chargé d'affaires is Jim Tito B. San Agustin, while the last resident ambassador was Ma. Teresita C. Daza, who was appointed to the position by President Duterte on November 28, 2018. The post had been vacant for at least the last 1.5 years before her appointment, a point which Chilean Ambassador José Miguel Capdevila had raised with Foreign Affairs Secretary Alan Peter Cayetano as the two countries were restarting free trade agreement talks.

Prior to becoming Ambassador, Daza, a career diplomat, had most recently been deployed to the Philippine Embassy in New Delhi as ambassador to India. Her appointment was confirmed by the Commission on Appointments on February 6, 2019, and Daza arrived in Santiago to assume her post just over two months later. The Santiago mission is one of the Philippines' smaller diplomatic missions, with only seven staff members.

Many of the Embassy's activities center around promoting Filipino interests and strengthening cultural and economic ties between the Philippines and Chile, particularly considering the country's relatively small number of resident Filipinos. These include donating books on Philippine history and culture to a number of local libraries, organizing cultural exhibits and lectures on José Rizal at the University of Santiago, Chile, and promoting the Philippines as a tourist destination for Chileans. However, while it does conduct outreach to the local community, results can be mixed: it was reported that no Filipinos in Chile voted in the 2016 general election in the first week of voting, although bad weather may have played a role.

In addition to activities in Chile, the Embassy exercises jurisdiction over Ecuador and Peru, where it has conducted outreach activities to provide consular services to Filipinos based in those countries.

See also
Chile–Philippines relations
List of diplomatic missions of the Philippines

References

External links
Official website of the Philippine Embassy in Santiago

P
S